Cystoderma is a genus of fungi in the family Agaricaceae or Cystodermataceae.  Its family position is in doubt and the family "Cystodermataceae" and tribe "Cystodermateae" have been proposed to include this group following recent molecular work.

Previously Cystoderma comprised a wider range of species but in 2002 Harmaja separated some of them off into the new genus Cystodermella (for instance Cystoderma cinnabarinum, C. elegans and C. granulosum).  The separation was made largely on the basis that the spores in the new genus were not at all amyloid.  Those remaining in Cystoderma have weakly to strongly amyloid spores, tend to have a persistent ring and to have arthroconidia.  DNA analysis supports the division into the two groups, but further investigation has shown that none of the morphological characteristics distinguish between them in a consistent clear-cut way.

The name probably comes from the Greek kýstis meaning pouch and derma meaning skin.

List of species
The following species are recognised in the genus Cystoderma:
 
 Cystoderma amianthinum (Scop.) Fayod
 Cystoderma andinum I. Saar & Læssøe
 Cystoderma arcticum Harmaja
 Cystoderma aureolum (Raithelh.) Raithelh.
 Cystoderma austrofallax Singer
 Cystoderma bonnardiae Thoen
 Cystoderma carcharias (Pers.) Fayod
 Cystoderma castellanum Blanco-Dios
 Cystoderma caucasicum Singer
 Cystoderma chocoanum Franco-Mol.
 Cystoderma clastotrichum (G. Stev.) E. Horak
 Cystoderma fallax A.H. Sm. & Singer
 Cystoderma ferruginosum Pegler
 Cystoderma fulvolateritium (Raithelh.) Raithelh.
 Cystoderma fumosopurpureum (Lasch) Fayod
 Cystoderma granosum (Morgan) A.H. Sm. & Singer
 Cystoderma granuliferum (Bas & Læssøe) I. Saar
 Cystoderma granulosocinnabarinum Singer
 Cystoderma gruberianum A.H. Sm.
 Cystoderma haematites (Sacc.) Konrad & Maubl.
 Cystoderma intermedium Harmaja
 Cystoderma japonicum Thoen & Hongo
 Cystoderma jasonis (Cooke & Massee) Harmaja
 Cystoderma jeoliense Dhanch., J.C. Bhatt & S.K. Pant
 Cystoderma kuehneri Singer
 Cystoderma lilaceum R.L. Zhao, M.Q. He & J.X. Li
 Cystoderma lilacipes Harmaja
 Cystoderma muscicola (Cleland) Grgur.
 Cystoderma neoamianthinum Hongo
 Cystoderma niveum Harmaja 
 Cystoderma ochracea Fayod 
 Cystoderma ossaeiformisporum (S. Imai) S. Ito 
 Cystoderma pseudoamianthinum R.L. Zhao, M.Q. He & J.X. Li 
 Cystoderma pulveraceum A.H. Sm. & Singer 
 Cystoderma rugosolateritium R.L. Zhao, M.Q. He & J.X. Li 
 Cystoderma saarenoksae Harmaja 
 Cystoderma simulatum P.D. Orton
 Cystoderma subglobisporum R.L. Zhao, M.Q. He & J.X. Li
 Cystoderma subornatum Raithelh.
 Cystoderma subvinaceum A.H. Sm.
 Cystoderma superbum Huijsman 
 Cystoderma texense Thiers
 Cystoderma tricholomoides Heinem. & Thoen
 Cystoderma tuomikoskii Harmaja

References
Footnotes

Citations

Agaricaceae
Agaricales genera